The Osilinka Ranges are a small subrange of the Swannell Ranges of the Omineca Mountains, located between Osilinka River and Lay Creek in northern British Columbia, Canada.

References

Osilinka Ranges in the Canadian Mountain Encyclopedia

Swannell Ranges